The Bulgarian Hockey League is an ice hockey league in Bulgaria.

Teams
As of 2021, the Bulgarian Hockey League consists of the following teams:

CSKA Sofia
Irbis-Skate Sofia
HC NSA Sofia
HC Slavia Sofia
HC Levski Sofia

Former teams
Cerveno Zname Sofia
Metallurg Pernik
Torpedo Sofia
Akademika Sofia
Red Star Sofia

Bulgarian League Champions

Titles by team

References

External links
www.bghockey.com (Bulgarian)
www.kunki.org (Bulgarian)

 
Top tier ice hockey leagues in Europe
Professional ice hockey leagues in Bulgaria